Park Place station may refer to:

 Park Place station (BMT Franklin Avenue Line), a New York City Subway station in Brooklyn; serving the 
 Park Place station (IRT Broadway–Seventh Avenue Line), a New York City Subway station in Manhattan; serving the 
 Park Place station (IRT Sixth Avenue Line), a former New York City Subway station in Manhattan; now demolished
 Park Place station (Newark), a former rapid transit station in New Jersey; now demolished

See also
 Park Street station (disambiguation)
 Park station (disambiguation)